Lectionary 267, designated by siglum ℓ 267 (in the Gregory-Aland numbering) is a Greek manuscript of the New Testament, on parchment. It is dated by a colophon to the year 1046.
Scrivener labelled it as 173e,
Gregory by 267e. The manuscript is lacunose.

Description 

The codex contains lessons from the Gospel of John, Matthew, and Luke (Evangelistarium), with two lacunae at the beginning and end.

The text is written in Greek large minuscule letters, on 300 parchment leaves, in two columns per page, 24 lines per page. Scrivener described it as "a grand cursive folio, sumptuously adorned". According to Gregory it is a beautiful manuscript.

The manuscript contains weekday Gospel lessons.

It contains text of John 8:3-11.

History 

The manuscript is dated by a colophon to the year 1046. It was written for the Church in Constantinople.

The manuscript was added to the list of New Testament manuscripts by Scrivener (number 173e) and Gregory (number 267e). Gregory saw the manuscript in 1886.

It was examined and described by Giovanni Luigi Mingarelli and Carlo Castellani.

The manuscript is not cited in the critical editions of the Greek New Testament (UBS3).

Currently the codex is housed at the Biblioteca Marciana (Gr. I.47 (978)) in Venice.

See also 

 List of New Testament lectionaries
 Biblical manuscript
 Textual criticism
 Lectionary 266

Notes and references

Bibliography 

 

Greek New Testament lectionaries
11th-century biblical manuscripts